Danny Mac (born 26 February 1988) is an English actor, best known for playing the role of Dodger Savage in the Channel 4 soap opera Hollyoaks from 2011 to 2015.

Early and personal life
Mac was born in Bromley, London, but then grew up in the seaside town of Bognor Regis. He trained for two years in Acting at Chichester College before attending The Arts Educational Schools in London graduating in 2009 with a BA Hons degree.

Whilst starring in Legally Blonde: The Musical, he met actress Carley Stenson. The pair began dating in 2011 and got married in 2017. In March 2021, the pair announced that they were expecting their first child together. Stenson gave birth to daughter Skye on 14 June 2021.

Career
He played Gavroche in the musical Les Miserables for a ten-week run in Southampton in 1998, and appeared in the role again in the West End in 1999. He performed again in the West End a decade later in the musical Wicked from May 2009, where he stayed for 21 months and was an understudy for the role of Boq. He left to join Hollyoaks in February 2011. In 2016, he reached the final in the fourteenth series of BBC One's Strictly Come Dancing. His professional dance partner was Oti Mabuse.  In week 9, after dancing a Charleston, he became the first contestant to both receive a score of ten from Craig Revel Horwood and to score a perfect 40 for the series. The next week, Mac became the first celebrity in the show's history to score a perfect 40 for a Samba. This was also the earliest double 40 in the show's history. He eventually reached the final, where he finished as joint runners-up with Louise Redknapp and her partner Kevin Clifton, losing out to winners Ore Oduba and his partner Joanne Clifton. 

In May 2017, he starred as Gabey in the musical On the Town at the Regent's Park Open Air Theatre in a production that ran until July of that year and was nominated for Best Musical Revival at the 2018 Olivier Awards. From September 2017 to April 2018 he starred as Joe Gillis in the multi award-winning touring production of Andrew Lloyd Webber’s Sunset Boulevard, a role for which he won 'Best Actor' at The Manchester Theatre Awards and was nominated for 'Best Actor' at the WhatsOnStage Awards. The production also won 'Best Regional Production' at the 18th Annual WhatsOnStage Awards and 'Best Musical' at The Manchester Theatre Awards.

In 2018, he appeared as Craig in the Sky One sitcom Trollied. In December 2018 and January 2019, Mac starred as Bob Wallace in White Christmas at Curve in Leicester. The production will transfer to the Dominion Theatre in the West End from November 2019 to January 2020. From May 2019 Mac toured the UK as Nino in the musical Amélie. In 2020, he played Edward in the London premiere of Pretty Woman: The Musical at the Piccadilly Theatre. Following the closure of theatres due to the COVID-19 pandemic, the production reopened at the Savoy Theatre in July 2021.

In December 2020, he appeared in an episode of the BBC soap opera Doctors as Jonathan Bateson.

Filmography

Awards and nominations

References

1988 births
Living people
English male soap opera actors
People from Bromley
Male actors from Kent